Adrian Garcea (born 1 June 1999) is a Romanian long-distance runner.

In 2018, he finished in 14th place in the men's 5000 metres event at the 2018 IAAF World U20 Championships held in Tampere, Finland. He also competed in the men's 1500 metres event where he was disqualified after infringement of the inside border.

In 2019, he competed in the senior men's race at the 2019 IAAF World Cross Country Championships held in Aarhus, Denmark. He finished in 118th place. In the same year, he also competed in the men's 1500 metres event at the 2019 European Athletics U23 Championships held in Gävle, Sweden. He did not qualify to compete in the final.

References

External links 
 

Living people
1999 births
Place of birth missing (living people)
Romanian male long-distance runners
Romanian male cross country runners